In Too Deep is the sixth book in The 39 Clues series. It was written by Jude Watson and released on November 3, 2009. The story is set in Australia and Indonesia.

Plot summary 

Amy and Dan have to decide how much they're willing to risk, and what they are. Ian and Natalie Kabra's mother, Isabel, joins the hunt, as she could not stand the mistakes her children have made. The Kabras send the Cahills an 'invitation' to a meeting at a dock in Australia. Amy can't decide which Lucian to trust – the cloying Isabel Kabra, or the serious, but deadly, Irina Spasky. Irina stops following Isabel and helps Amy with the clue hunt. She turned away from Isabel because she lost her boy, Nikolai, when she was on a mission. Amy's life is threatened by Isabel who holds her out to shark infested waters, but she escapes thanks to Hamilton Holt, who helped her because of their previous alliance in The Black Circle. Amy and Dan are briefly distanced from each other when Irina tells Amy and Dan about their parents being murdered (Amy had been too filled with grief to tell Dan that their parents were murdered).

Amy and Dan continue their search to find out that Bob Troppo was actually Ekaterina agent Robert Cahill Henderson, who came devastatingly close to finding all 39 clues in his Indonesian lab. His work was destroyed by the Krakatoa eruption and he fled to Australia. Amy and Dan find a note written by him, a strange poem seemingly pointing to the clue. The Cahills discover the clue – water – with the help of Alistair Oh. However, Isabel Kabra sets the house they are staying in on fire, and Irina Spasky chooses to save Amy, Dan, and Alistair at the price of her own life. The book ends with Amy and Dan thinking that they now are doing the clue hunt for their parents and for Irina.

References

The 39 Clues novels
2009 American novels
Collaborative fiction
Sequel novels
Novels set in Australia
Novels set in Indonesia
2009 children's books